Carlebach is the family name of a notable Jewish family originally from Germany that now lives all over the world, it can refer to:

People:
 Elisheva Carlebach Jofen, American scholar of early modern Jewish history
 Emil Carlebach (1914–2001), German writer and journalist
 Ephraim Carlebach (1879–1936), German-born Orthodox rabbi
 Ezriel Carlebach (1909–1956), Israeli journalist and editorial writer
 Felix Carlebach (1911–2008), Rabbi in Manchester, England
 Hartwig Naftali Carlebach (1889–1967), founder of the Carlebach Shul, father of Rabbi Shlomo Carlebach
 Joseph Carlebach (1883–1942), German Orthodox rabbi, scholar and scientist 
 Julius Carlebach, (1922–2001), German-British Rabbi and scholar
 Naftoli Carlebach (1916–2005), Orthodox rabbi and accountant
 Neshama Carlebach, singer
 Shlomo Carlebach (1925–1994), rabbi, religious teacher, composer, and singer
 Shlomo Carlebach (1925–2022), German-born American Haredi rabbi and scholar
Other:
 Carlebach minyan, Jewish prayer services in the style of Rabbi Shlomo Carlebach.
 Carlebach movement, Orthodox Jewish movement inspired by the legacy of Rabbi Shlomo Carlebach.
 Mevo Modi'im, a village in central Israel founded by Rabbi Shlomo Carlebach.

 
Jewish surnames
Yiddish-language surnames